Byron H. Pelton is a state senator from Sterling, Colorado. A Republican, Pelton represents Colorado's 1st Senate district, which includes all or part of Logan, Morgan, Phillips, Sedgwick, Washington, Weld, and Yuma, counties in northeast Colorado, including all or parts of the communities of Greeley, Sterling, Fort Morgan,
Lochbuie, and Severance.

Background
Pelton, his wife, and two daughters live in Sterling, Colorado where they run a small cow-calf operation. Originally from Cheyenne Wells, Colorado, Pelton is a United States Navy veteran. In the Navy, he was trained as an electrician, and, upon being honorably discharged from the Navy, he moved to northeast Colorado and worked as an electrician for 20 years.

Pelton was elected Logan County commissioner in 2016 and was re-elected in 2020. He has served on several task forces and boards, such as the Governor's Behavioral Health Taskforce. He has also served on the board of directors of Colorado Counties, Inc. and was named "Colorado Commissioner of the Year" in 2021.

Elections
In the 2022 Colorado Senate election, Pelton ran unopposed, winning 100.00% of the total votes cast.

References

External links
 Legislative website
 Campaign website

21st-century American politicians
Republican Party Colorado state senators
Living people
County commissioners in Colorado
People from Sterling, Colorado
American electricians
Ranchers from Colorado
Year of birth missing (living people)